Harriet Tubman School was a segregated public school in Columbia, Maryland, operating from 1949 to 1965. It was part of Howard County Public School System.

History
Harriet Tubman School was the last operating segregated school in the Howard County Public School System. The historic building has been re-purposed for use by the school system for maintenance offices.

Howard County's first classes for African American children beyond 7th grade was held in Cooksville in 1937. The four room school house expanded to 11 grade levels by 1939 to become the county's sole school offering high school level classes. The Harriet Tubman school, in Simpsonville, was established as the first dedicated high school for African Americans in 1948 with the first graduating class in 1952. In 1956, a $50,000 shop building was approved while the school board was under scrutiny for delaying integration of Howard County Schools after the supreme court ruling. Harriet Tubman operated for 16 years as a segregated school and was closed rather than integrated. The school closed in 1965. An all new school known as Atholton High was championed to be built on the same property by local residents rather than integrate white students into the Harriet Tubman School. The Rouse Company had recently  bought land adjacent to the school and planned to sell back  at cost to the school board. In July 1964, Tom Harris of the planning commission presented a recommendation from Loren Murray of Johannes & Murray to pass on any additions to the Harriet Tubman school and buy the adjoining  for $12,000 from Columbia Research and Development to build an all new high school.

A public effort has been underway since the early 2000s to turn over the building for a Cultural Center.

References

External links
Official website

Buildings and structures in Columbia, Maryland
Public schools in Howard County, Maryland
African-American history of Howard County, Maryland
1949 establishments in Maryland
Historically segregated African-American schools in Maryland
Defunct schools in Maryland
Harriet Tubman